Jayakrishnan (born 21 January 1987), better known as Jayakrishnan Kichu, is an Indian actor, Associate Director, and Dubbing Artist who predominantly works in the Malayalam film industry. He was introduced as an actor by director Kamal with the film Manjupoloru Penkutti in 2004. He has performed the lead role in that movie. After that, he acted in Mohanlal starer Chandrolsavam. He also acted in movies such as Out of Syllabus, Bharathan Effect, Rakshakan, Subhadram, SMS, Shakespeare M.A. Malayalam, Raamanam, Mayakazcha, Dalamaramarangal, Ayal Sasi, Sandwich, 8:20.

Jayakrishnan has also starred in many Malayalam television serials. He also a television presenter, currently the host of Salt & Pepper in Kaumudy TV. Some of his notable serials are Kumkumapoov, Ammakai, Rudraveena, Mazhaariyathe, Balamani, Decemberile Akasham, Jagratha, Namukku Parkkuvan Munthiri Thoppukal.

Early life 

Jayakrishnan was born in a Hindu family in Karakulam, Trivandrum to Jayagopalan Nair and Sreekala. His father is an expatriate and his mother a homemaker. He has a sibling, his name is Jayashankar. Jayakrishnan received his school education at Iqbal Higher Secondary School, Peringamala. He graduated from Allama Iqbal College Peringamala.  He made his acting debut in the Malayalam film industry in the film Manjupolooru Penkutti directed by Kamal.

Career 

Jayakrishnan's Malayalam film industry debut was under Kamal in Manjupolooru Pennkutty. The second movie was with Mohanlal in Chandrolsavam directed by Ranjith. After that, he acted in some movies in  the supporting role. He has also dubbed for movies such as Summer in Bangkok, Innanu Aa kalyanam, Three Char Sua Beez, and Nayak. He has also worked as an associate director in the Malayalam film industry. he worked in 101 Chodyangal, Ayal Sasi, Rameshan oru Peralla, Done Many Ads. He is the host of the Food and Travel show Salt and Pepper in Kaumudy TV.

Filmography

Television

References

External links 

 IMDb Profile
 Facebook
 Talks - Let Me Talk

1987 births
Living people
Indian male film actors
Male actors in Malayalam cinema
Male actors in Malayalam television